María del Rosario Leticia Jasso Valencia (born 19 October 1948) is a Mexican politician affiliated with the National Action Party (previously to the Institutional Revolutionary Party and later to the New Alliance Party). As of 2014, she served as Senator of the LXI Legislature of the Mexican Congress representing Puebla as replacement of Rafael Moreno Valle Rosas.

References

1948 births
Living people
People from Puebla
Women members of the Senate of the Republic (Mexico)
Members of the Senate of the Republic (Mexico)
National Action Party (Mexico) politicians
21st-century Mexican politicians
21st-century Mexican women politicians